Gesner Abelard (born 22 February 1922) was a Haitian painter and sculptor. Born in Port-au-Prince, Abelard began life as a mechanic, then studied painting and sculpture at the Industrial School of Port-au-Prince under the painter Humberman Charles. He became a member of the Haitian Centre d'Art in 1948. In 1949, he received a bronze medal at the International Exposition celebrating the bicentennial of Port-au-Prince. Many of his paintings depict birds, trees and scenes of Haitian life, and he is considered a naïve artist. Abelard is believed to be deceased.

References 

 
 

1922 births
Possibly living people
Haitian artists
Haitian painters
Haitian male painters
Haitian sculptors
Naïve painters

He painted The Garden of Eden —sold in 1970– along with other numerous Naive works brought to the U.S. by Yvette Mimieux and Elaine Hollingsworth the same year. When Papa Duvalier died their involvement ended.